Artion Poçi (born 23 July 1977 in Fier) is a retired Albanian football player.

Playing career

International
He made his debut for Albania as a second-half substitute for Fatmir Vata in an April 2001 friendly match against Turkey in Gaziantep, his sole international game.

Managerial career
A former player of the club, Poçi was appointed manager of Besa Kavajë in August 2017, only to be replaced by Bledar Sinella a month later in a managerial merry-go-around at the club.

Honours

Dinamo 
 Albanian Superliga (1): 2007-08
 Albanian Supercup (1): 2008

Besa 
 Albanian Cup (1): 2009-10

References

External links
 

1977 births
Living people
Sportspeople from Fier
Association football midfielders
Albanian footballers
Albania international footballers
KF Apolonia Fier players
KF Bylis Ballsh players
FK Dinamo Tirana players
Besa Kavajë players
Kategoria Superiore players
Albanian football managers
Besa Kavajë managers